Browse, browser or browsing may refer to:

Programs
Web browser, a program used to access the World Wide Web
Code browser, a program for navigating source code
File browser or file manager, a program used to manage files and related objects
Hardware browser, a program for displaying networked hardware devices
Image browser or image viewer, a program that can display stored graphical images
Browser service, a feature of Microsoft Windows to browse shared network resources

Other
Browsing, a kind of orienting strategy in animals and human beings
Browsing (herbivory), a type of feeding behavior in herbivores
Browse Island, Australia
Browse LNG, Australian liquefied natural gas plant project
Browser (cat), a Texan library cat